Robert Williams (September 15, 1894 – November 3, 1931) was an American stage and film actor. He is best known for his first, and only, leading role in the 1931 romantic comedy Platinum Blonde, opposite Loretta Young and Jean Harlow. Williams died of peritonitis three days after the film's premiere.

Career
Born in Morganton, North Carolina in 1894 (some sources state 1897 or 1899), Williams ran away from home at the age 11 to join a tent show. He later worked on showboats in Mississippi before making his way to New York. After appearing in several stage productions, Williams landed a role in Eyes of Youth, starring Marjorie Rambeau. The role boosted his career and gained him notice. He put his career on hold to join the United States Army where he served in 166th Infantry Regiment during World War I. After the war, Williams returned to the United States and resumed his acting career. In 1922, he made his Broadway stage debut in the popular stage comedy Abie's Irish Rose. He also appeared in productions of That French Lady, Scarlet Pages, and Love, Honor and Betray.

After appearing as "Johnnie Coles" in the play Rebound in 1930, Williams was chosen by director Edward H. Griffith to reprise the role in the 1931 film version. He received favorable reviews for his work in the film and followed with a supporting role in Devotion, which was also released in 1931. Later that same year, Williams was cast in his first and only leading role in the romantic comedy film Platinum Blonde, starring Loretta Young and Jean Harlow. It was his final onscreen appearance.

Personal life
Williams was married three times; his first marriage was to singer Marion Harris in 1921 with whom he had a daughter, Mary Ellen. Williams and Harris divorced in 1922. In March 1924, he married actress Alice Lake. They separated three times before divorcing in 1925. At the time of his death, Williams was married to actress Nina Penn.

Death
On November 3, 1931, three days after the premiere of Platinum Blonde, Williams died of peritonitis at Hollywood Hospital after undergoing two operations for acute appendicitis the previous week. He was buried in Forest Lawn Memorial Park in Glendale, California.

Broadway credits

Filmography

References

External links

1894 births
1931 deaths
20th-century American male actors
Male actors from North Carolina
American male film actors
United States Army personnel of World War I
American male silent film actors
American male stage actors
Burials at Forest Lawn Memorial Park (Glendale)
Deaths from peritonitis
United States Army soldiers
People from Morganton, North Carolina